Wang Lequan (born 21 December 1944) is a retired Chinese politician, most notable for being the Communist Party Secretary in Xinjiang, the autonomous region's top political office, between 1994 and 2010. From 2004 to 2012, Wang was also a member of the Politburo of the Chinese Communist Party. From 2010 to 2012 he was a Deputy Secretary of the Political and Legal Affairs Commission. He retired from active politics in 2012, and became President of the China Law Society in 2013.

Life and career
Wang Lequan was born in Shouguang, Shandong in December 1944. He joined the Chinese Communist Party in 1966. He was a post-graduate at the Central Party School of the CCP Central Committee. Wang ran the Communist Youth League in Shandong Province in the mid-1980s and became vice governor of Shandong in 1989.

Wang was the Secretary of the CCP Xinjiang Committee from 1994 until 2010. As Secretary, he was responsible for implementing modernization programs in Xinjiang. He encouraged industrialization, development of commerce, and investments in roads and railways. He furthered the development of the oil and gas fields in the region, link-up of pipelines from Kazakhstan to eastern China. On the other hand, he constrained local culture and religion, substituted Mandarin for Uyghur language in primary schools; restricted or banned, among government workers, the wearing of beards and headscarves, fasting and praying while on the job.

Wang was a member of the 16th and the 17th Politburos of the Central Committee of the Chinese Communist Party. He is known for his hardline approach to ethnic minorities. He acquired the nickname "the stability secretary" for his ability to enter into a chaotic situation and bring it to order.

Wang was widely criticized by Uighurs and foreign scholars of Xinjiang for his hard-liner policies. After the 2009 July riot in Ürümqi, Han Chinese also became frustrated with his leadership because of the slow progress in restoring social order. As a result, many individuals began to call for his resignation in public demonstrations. He was removed from the post in April 2010, and transferred to work on the Central Political and Legal Affairs Commission as a Deputy Secretary under Zhou Yongkang. He was replaced by Zhang Chunxian. Wang remained in the Political and Legal Affairs Committee until the 18th Party Congress when he retired from active politics. In November 2013 Wang became the president of the China Law Society.

References

External links
 Biography of Wang Lequan, People's Daily Online.

1944 births
Chinese Communist Party politicians from Shandong
Living people
Politicians from Weifang
People's Republic of China politicians from Shandong
Political office-holders in Xinjiang
Vice-governors of Shandong
Members of the 17th Politburo of the Chinese Communist Party
Members of the 16th Politburo of the Chinese Communist Party